Iain  McDonald (born 14 August 1952) is a Scottish former footballer who played as a left winger.

McDonald began his career with Rangers and played in eleven league matches for the Ibrox side before moving to Dundee United in 1974. By 1976, McDonald had featured in thirty league games for The Terrors but injury forced the winger to retire before his 25th birthday.

References 
 

1952 births
Living people
Footballers from Edinburgh
Association football wingers
Scottish footballers
Rangers F.C. players
Dundee United F.C. players
Scottish Football League players